In phonetics, vowel roundedness is the amount of rounding in the lips during the articulation of a vowel. It is labialization of a vowel. When a rounded vowel is pronounced, the lips form a circular opening, and unrounded vowels are pronounced with the lips relaxed. In most languages, front vowels tend to be unrounded, and back vowels tend to be rounded. However, some languages, such as French, German and Icelandic, distinguish rounded and unrounded front vowels of the same height (degree of openness), and Vietnamese distinguishes rounded and unrounded back vowels of the same height. Alekano has only unrounded vowels. In the International Phonetic Alphabet vowel chart, rounded vowels are the ones that appear on the right in each pair of vowels.
Thus  has less rounding than cardinal , and  has more (closer to the rounding of cardinal ).

Types of rounding

There are two types of vowel rounding: protrusion and compression. In protruded rounding, the corners of the mouth are drawn together and the lips protrude like a tube, with their inner surface visible. In compressed rounding, the corners of the mouth are drawn together, but the lips are also drawn together horizontally ("compressed") and do not protrude, with only their outer surface visible. Back or central compressed vowels and front protruded vowels are uncommon, and a contrast between the two types has been found to be phonemic in only one instance.

Compressed vowels may be pronounced either with the corners of the mouth drawn in, by some definitions rounded, or with the corners spread and, by the same definitions, unrounded. The distinction may be transcribed  vs  (or  vs ).

The distinction applies marginally to other consonants. In Southern Teke, the sole language reported to have a phonemic , the labiodental sound is "accompanied by strong protrusion of both lips", whereas the  found as an allophone of  before  in languages such as English is not protruded, as the lip contacts the teeth along its upper or outer edge. Also, in at least one account of speech acquisition, a child's pronunciation of clown involves a lateral  with the upper teeth contacting the upper-outer edge of the lip, but in crown, a non-lateral  is pronounced with the teeth contacting the inner surface of the protruded lower lip.

Some vowels transcribed with rounded IPA letters may not be rounded at all.

It is possible to mimic the acoustic effect of rounded vowels by narrowing the cheeks, so-called "cheek rounding", which is inherent in back protruded (but not front compressed) vowels. The technique is used by ventriloquists to mask the visible rounding of back vowels like . It is not clear if it is used by languages with rounded vowels that do not use visible rounding.

Of the open-mid vowels,  occurs in Swedish and Norwegian. Central  and back  have not been reported to occur in any language.

Spread and neutral
The lip position of unrounded vowels may be classified into two groups: spread and neutral. Front vowels are usually pronounced with the lips spread, and the spreading becomes more significant as the height of the vowel increases. Open vowels are often neutral, i.e. neither rounded nor spread, because the open jaw allows for limited rounding or spreading of the lips. This is reflected in the IPA's definition of the cardinal , which is unrounded yet not spread either.

Roundedness and labialization
Protruded rounding is the vocalic equivalent of consonantal labialization. Thus, rounded vowels and labialized consonants affect one another by phonetic assimilation: Rounded vowels labialize consonants, and labialized consonants round vowels.

In many languages, such effects are minor phonetic detail, but in others, they become significant. For example, in Standard Chinese, the vowel  is pronounced  after labial consonants, an allophonic effect that is so important that it is encoded in pinyin transliteration: alveolar   'many' vs. labial   'wave'.

In the Northwest Caucasian languages of the Caucasus and the Sepik languages of Papua New Guinea, historically rounded vowels have become unrounded, with the rounding being taken up by the consonant.

A few ancient Indo-European languages like Latin had labiovelar consonants.

Phonemic roundedness in English
Vowel pairs differentiated by roundedness can be found in some British dialects (such as the Cardiff dialect, Geordie and Port Talbot English) as well as in General South African English. They involve a contrastive pair of close-mid vowels, with the unrounded vowel being either   or a monophthongal   and the rounded counterpart being  . Contrasts based on roundedness are rarely categorical in English and they may be enhanced by additional differences in height, backness or diphthongization.

In addition, contemporary Standard Southern British English as well as Western Pennsylvania English contrast  with  mostly by rounding. An example of a minimal pairs is nut vs. not. The vowels are open-mid  in the former dialect and open  in the latter. In Western Pennsylvania English, the  class also includes the  class (see cot-caught merger) and the  one (see father-bother merger). In addition,  may be longer than  due to its being a free vowel: . The latter often includes the  class as the cot-caught merger is common in Scotland. This means that while nought  contrasts with nut  by rounding, not may have a different vowel .

General South African English is unique among accents of English in that it can feature up to three front rounded vowels, with two of them having unrounded counterparts.

The potential contrast between the close-mid  and the open-mid  is hard to perceive by outsiders, making utterances such as the total onslaught  sound almost like the turtle onslaught .

See also
Close back compressed vowel  =  =  =  (in Japanese and Swedish)
Near-close back compressed vowel  =  (in Swedish)
Close central compressed vowel  (in Norwegian)
Mid central compressed vowel  (in Swedish)
Close front compressed vowel  (in French, German, etc.)
Mid front compressed vowel  (in French, German, etc.)
Close front protruded vowel  (in Swedish)
Near-close front protruded vowel  (in Swedish)
Close-mid front protruded vowel  (in Swedish)
Open-mid front protruded vowel  (in Swedish)
Close central protruded vowel 
Mid central protruded vowel 
Close back protruded vowel  (common)
Mid back protruded vowel  (common)
List of phonetics topics

Notes

References

External links

Vowels
Labial consonants